The 1952 Pau Grand Prix was a Formula Two motor race held on 14 April 1952 at the Pau circuit, in Pau, Pyrénées-Atlantiques, France. The Grand Prix served as the first round of the French Formula Two Championship and was won by Alberto Ascari, driving the Ferrari 500. Louis Rosier finished second and Jean Behra third.

Classification

Race

References

Pau Grand Prix
Pau Grand Prix
Pau Grand Prix